Therapeutic angiogenesis is an experimental area in the treatment of ischemia, the condition associated with decrease in blood supply to certain organs, tissues, or body parts. This is usually caused by constriction or obstruction of the blood vessels. Angiogenesis is the natural healing process by which new blood vessels are formed to supply the organ or part in deficit with oxygen-rich blood. The goal of therapeutic angiogenesis is to stimulate the creation of new blood vessels in ischemic organs, tissues, or parts with the hope of increasing the level of oxygen-rich blood reaching these areas.

See also
 Vascular endothelial growth factor

References

1. Isner JM. Therapeutic angiogenesis: a new frontier for vascular therapy.
Vasc Med. 1996 1: 79–87.

2. Ferrara N, Kerbel RS. Angiogenesis as a therapeutic target.
Nature. 2005 Dec 15;438(7070): 967–74.

3. Losordo DW, Dimmeler S. Therapeutic angiogenesis and vasculogenesis
for ischemic disease. Part I: angiogenic cytokines.
Circulation. 2004 109: 2487-2491

4. Cao L, Mooney DJ. Spatiotemporal control over growth factor signaling for therapeutic neovascularization.
Adv Drug Deliv Rev. 2007 Nov 10;59(13):1340-50.

Vascular procedures